The 1920 United States presidential election in Iowa took place on November 2, 1920, as part of the 1920 United States presidential election which was held throughout all contemporary 48 states. Voters chose 13 representatives, or electors to the Electoral College, who voted for president and vice president.

Iowa voted for the Republican nominee, Senator Warren G. Harding of Ohio, over the Democratic nominee, Governor James M. Cox of Ohio. Harding ran with Governor Calvin Coolidge of Massachusetts, while Cox ran with Assistant Secretary of the Navy Franklin D. Roosevelt of New York. Harding won the state by a margin of 45.45%.

With 70.91 percent of the popular, Iowa would prove to be Harding's fifth strongest state in the 1920 election terms of popular vote percentage after North Dakota, Vermont, Michigan, and Wisconsin. Harding's performance is, by a margin of 6.79 percent, the best by any candidate in Iowa presidential election history, and he and Dwight D. Eisenhower in 1952 are the only presidential candidates to sweep all Iowa's counties.

Results

Results by county

See also
 United States presidential elections in Iowa

References

Iowa
1920
1920 Iowa elections